Bari Sadri is a town and a municipality in Chittaurgarh district in the state of Rajasthan, India.

Geography

Demographics
As of the 2011 India census, Bari Sadri had a population of 15,713. Males constitute 51% of the population. Bari Sadri has an average literacy rate of 71% with 79% of males and 62% of females are literate. 12% of the population is under 6 years of age.

Economy
Bari Sadri has industrial areas, where there are many small farms or other agriculture centers. There is also a government hospital and many private hospitals. Bari Sadri has one ICICI and SBI banks branches for local business transactions. It has a very old post office which also working as delivery support for Amazon and other online businesses.

History 
Bari sadri was the Seniormost Thikana of Mewar. It comprised 101 villages and had a population, in 1931, of 18,503 and revenue of Rs.1,04,000/-

The Estate of Bari sadri was granted to Rajrana Ajay singh ji (Ajja ji) who came to Mewar with his brother Sajjan Singh ji (Sajja ji) from Dhrangadhra State in present day Gujarat. Ajja ji, with his younger brother Sajja ji, were dispossessed in an intrigue by their uncle and their younger brother Ranoji was annointed as the Maharaja of Dhrangadhra.
.They then left for employment with the then Maharana of Mewar Rana Raimal, the father of Rana Sanga. Rajrana Ajja ji fought in the battle of Khanwa with Rana Sanga against Babur . His grandson Rajrana Jhala Man Singh ji, who famously wore the Armours of Maharana Pratap Singh, during the Battle of Haldighati. 

the Rajrana of Bari sadri at the Durbar hall of Maharana of Mewar took the highest seat of prominence right next of the Maharana himself. Even above that of the Yuvraj of Mewar.

Bari sadri holds the 1st place among the 16 Umrao of Mewar and the 1st place in the Udaipur Darbar hall.

Climate 
The climate of Bari Sadri is generally warm and temperate. It is classified as Cwa ( Monsoon-influenced humid subtropical climate) by the Köppen-Geiger system. In Bari Sadri, the average annual temperature is 24.9 °C. The rainfall in Bari Sadri averages 817 mm annually.

References

Cities and towns in Chittorgarh district